Beethoven Javier (June 20, 1947 – August 9, 2017), nicknamed "Cuco", was a Uruguayan former football player and coach. Javier played the left wing position.

Playing career

Club career
In his professional career, Javier started at left wing for Defensor Sporting Club during their championship 1976 season. He also played for River Plate, Colón, Rentistas and Huracán Buceo.

International career
Javier made five appearances for the Uruguay national football team in 1976 and 1977.

Management career
Javier coached Huracán Buceo, Central Español and Miramar Misiones.

References

1947 births
2017 deaths
People from Treinta y Tres Department
Uruguayan footballers
Uruguay international footballers
Uruguayan football managers
C.A. Rentistas managers
Defensor Sporting players
Association football wingers
River Plate Montevideo managers